Domjüchsee is a lake in the course of a stream named Stendlitz in the Mecklenburgische Seenplatte district in Mecklenburg-Vorpommern, Germany.

Lakes of Mecklenburg-Western Pomerania
LDomjuchsee